William Crowley Weston (April 28, 1866 – September 19, 1932) was a New Zealand-born architect in the United States who worked in Birmingham, Alabama, and Detroit.

Among his works are:
Age-Herald Building, Birmingham, NRHP-listed
City Federal Building, Birmingham
Heaviest Corner on Earth, 1st Ave., N and 20th St., N., Birmingham
Wimberly-Thomas Warehouse, 1809 First Ave. S, Birmingham
One or more works in NRHP-listed Downtown Birmingham Historic District, Birmingham, NRHP-listed
One or more works in NRHP-listed Morris Avenue–First Avenue North Historic District, 2000--2400 blks. of Morris Ave. and 2100--2500 blks. of First Ave. N., Birmingham
 Metropolitan Building, Detroit
 The Park Shelton, Detroit
 Fort Wayne Hotel, Detroit

References

American architects
Architects from Alabama
1866 births
1932 deaths
New Zealand emigrants to the United States
Weston family (New Zealand)
Architects from Detroit